Rafael Vázquez (26 March 1929 - 22 July 2021) was a Mexican singer, songwriter, and actor. Born in Tampico, Tamaulipas, he studied voice with singing teacher Carlos Abreu before achieving success as a singer at Mexico City radio station XEW in 1950. In 1959, he married Mexican singer and actress Carmela Rey, with whom he formed the successful duet Carmela y Rafael, known as "Mexico's Romantic Couple"; together they made 121 records and won numerous awards. He made his acting debut in the film Ruletero a toda marcha (1962), with Eulalio González, María Duval, and Norma Angélica Ladrón de Guevara.

References

External links
Rafael Vázquez en Rate Your Music
Biography of Héctor Brian on Buenamusica

1929 births
Mexican songwriters
Mexican male singers
Mexican male film actors
Singers from Tamaulipas
Actors from Tamaulipas
People from Tampico, Tamaulipas
Living people